HMS Royal George was a 100-gun first rate ship of the line of the Royal Navy, launched from Chatham Dockyard on 16 September 1788. She was the fifth ship of the Royal Navy to bear the name.

Royal George served as the flagship at the Battle of Groix and wore the flag of Admiral Alexander Hood at the Glorious First of June. In 1807 she served as the flagship of Admiral Sir John Duckworth during the Alexandria expedition of 1807.

She was broken up in 1822.

Citations and notes

References

Lavery, Brian (2003) The Ship of the Line - Volume 1: The development of the battlefleet 1650-1850. Conway Maritime Press. .
George Thom. Paget & Taylor Family Tree. Retrieved 9 August 2008.

Ships of the line of the Royal Navy
Individual sailing vessels
1788 ships